The A Eighth Avenue Express is a rapid transit service in the B Division of the New York City Subway. Its route emblem, or "bullet", is colored  since it uses the IND Eighth Avenue Line in Manhattan.

The A operates at all times. Daytime service operates between 207th Street in Inwood, Manhattan and Mott Avenue in Far Rockaway, Queens or Lefferts Boulevard in Richmond Hill, Queens, making express stops in Manhattan and Brooklyn and local stops in Queens. Limited rush-hour service also operates to or from Beach 116th Street in Rockaway Park, Queens. Late night service operates only between 207th Street and Far Rockaway, making local stops along its entire route; during this time, a shuttle train (the Lefferts Boulevard Shuttle) operates between Euclid Avenue and Lefferts Boulevard.

History

Early history 

The A and AA were the first services on the IND Eighth Avenue Line when it opened on September 10, 1932. The Independent Subway System (IND) used single letters to refer to express services and double letters for local services. The A ran express between 207th Street and Chambers Street, and the AA ran local between 168th Street and Chambers Street, known at the time as Hudson Terminal. During late-night hours (from 1:45 a.m. to 5:45 a.m.) and on Sundays, the A did not run and the AA made all stops along the line.

The A was extended to Jay Street–Borough Hall on February 1, 1933, when the Cranberry Street Tunnel to Brooklyn opened, and to Bergen Street, when the extension opened on March 20. On July 1, the A began running express at all times, stopping at 155th Street and 163rd Street during late nights. The A was extended to Church Avenue on October 7.

On April 9, 1936, the IND Fulton Street Line was opened to Rockaway Avenue. The 1936 extension played an integral part in the establishment of Bedford-Stuyvesant as Brooklyn's central African American community. The A train connected Harlem, Manhattan's central African American community, to areas of Bedford-Stuyvesant that provided residential opportunities for African Americans not found throughout the rest of New York City.

On December 30, 1946, and November 28, 1948, the line was extended to Broadway–East New York (now Broadway Junction) and Euclid Avenue, respectively. On October 24, 1949, express service in Brooklyn to Broadway–East New York began with the A running express during rush hours, with the  extended to provide local service.

Extensions to Ozone Park and the Rockaways 

On April 29, 1956, Grant Avenue was opened, and the line was extended over the BMT Fulton Street Line to Lefferts Boulevard. On weekdays except midnights, alternate trains terminated at Lefferts Boulevard and at Euclid Avenue. During weekends, they terminated at Euclid Avenue with a shuttle to Lefferts Boulevard.

Two months later, on June 28, 1956, the former Long Island Rail Road Rockaway Beach Branch, having been rebuilt to subway specifications, began service to Rockaway Park and Wavecrest (Beach 25th Street). At this time, rush hour express service on the Fulton Street Line with the E train began.

On September 16, 1956, the A was extended to the Rockaways, replacing the E. At the time, alternate trains continued running to Lefferts Boulevard. On January 27, 1957, non-rush hour through service to the Rockaways was discontinued and was replaced by a shuttle running between Euclid Avenue and Wavecrest (now Beach 25th Street). Non-rush hour A train service was now to Lefferts Boulevard.

On June 18, 1957, the New York City Transit Authority (NYCTA) announced plans to have Rockaway-bound A trains skip Grant Avenue, Hudson Street, and Boyd Street during rush hours on a one-month pilot, to take effect July 1. The change was made to determine whether ten minutes could be reduced off of travel times to the Rockaways; the NYCTA only believed it would save three minutes. In the face of community opposition, the NYCTA announced that it would take more time to review the change, meaning that it ultimately did not take effect on July 1.

On January 16, 1958, with the opening of the new terminal Far Rockaway–Mott Avenue, rush hour A service was extended. On September 8, 1958, the A train replaced the E train in the Rockaways again, and A trains resumed alternating between Euclid Avenue and Lefferts Boulevard. "Round-robin" service from Euclid Avenue to both Rockaway terminals began, non-rush hours, while through A service ran to Lefferts Boulevard. On September 8, 1959, the A began to run local in Brooklyn during rush hours, making it local at all times in Brooklyn, as the E became express in Brooklyn during rush hours. On July 9, 1967, the A trains running to Euclid Avenue were extended to Far Rockaway middays, evenings, and weekends, replacing the HH shuttle on that branch.

Simplifying service patterns 
As part of systemwide changes in bus and subway service, major changes were made to A service in Brooklyn and Queens on January 2, 1973. The A train became the express service along Fulton Street and the E train became the local during rush hours. Express service would be provided for a longer period during rush hours as the span of E service to Brooklyn, which would cover local stops, was also increased. In addition, the A trips that terminate at Euclid Avenue during rush hours were extended to Far Rockaway, replacing E service. Service would now run to Far Rockaway between 5:30 a.m. and 11:30 p.m.. A trains would alternate between Lefferts Boulevard and Far Rockaway. These changes were initially supposed to take effect on September 11, 1972.

On August 30, 1976, the CC became the Fulton Street Local during rush hours, replacing E service. On August 27, 1977, the A began making local stops in Manhattan during late nights, when the AA was not running.

On December 11, 1988, A trains began running local between 145th Street and 168th Street on weekends to replace the discontinued K (formerly AA) service, and express on the IND Fulton Street Line in Brooklyn during middays and rush hours, with the C providing local service during those times. On September 30, 1990, A trains began operating local between 145th Street and 168th Street during weekday evenings.

In 1991, at a series of meetings, the NYCTA presented proposed changes to A, C, and H service that would shorten the length of the C, simplify the service pattern during late nights to most efficiently serve the majority of riders, provide direct express service to Rockaway Park during rush hours in the peak direction, and provide shuttle connections during non-peak periods between Rockaway Park and through A train service. The service pattern devised was designed to improve operations by reducing route length and complexity, make service more attractive, simplify confusing service patterns, and reduce transfers for passengers traveling during late nights.

At the time, A service ran to Lefferts Boulevard and Far Rockaway during the day while the C ran to Rockaway Park during rush hours. During late nights, A service ran to Lefferts Boulevard, while service to both branches in the Rockaways was provided by round-robin H shuttle service to Euclid Avenue.  As part of the changes proposed, round-robin shuttle service would be discontinued, through A late night service would run to Far Rockaway, and service to Lefferts Boulevard and Rockaway Park would be provided by separate shuttle services with timed transfers to through A service. Rush hour local C service to Rockaway Park would be replaced by through A express service that ran every 20 minutes in the peak direction for a period of one hour and twenty minutes in rush hours to and from 59th Street–Columbus Circle. The initial proposal had these trips terminate at 34th Street, but this was changed to 59th Street following public comments. These five rush hour express trips were marketed as a "commuter rail style service", and special efforts were to be made to follow the arrival and departure times listed in the route's timetable, which was publicly distributed to riders. In addition, H service to Rockaway Park would be replaced by the Rockaway Park Shuttle, which would run between Broad Channel and Rockaway Park, and C service would be truncated to Euclid Avenue.

In April 1992, the MTA Board approved the proposed change to service in the Rockaways, which were expected to encourage ridership growth in the long term, and reduced NYCTA's annual operating budget by $20,000. The changes took effect on October 23, 1992 with modification. Late night shuttle service to Lefferts Boulevard would terminate at Euclid Avenue, not Rockaway Boulevard. Later on, the rush hour A trips to Rockaway Park were extended from 59th Street to Dyckman Street and Inwood–207th Street.

On May 29, 1994, A trains began running express on weekends from 7 a.m. to 11 p.m. between 168th Street and 145th Street, with C trains trains being extended from 145th Street to 168th Street to cover local stops. A corresponding change was made to weekday midday A service on April 30, 1995, though this change was discontinued on November 12, 1995. On March 1, 1998, A trains began running express between 168th Street and 145th Street during middays and early evenings, with local service provided by extended C service. On May 2, 1999, the A became the express on the Fulton Street Line at all times except late nights, and C service was extended from World Trade Center to Euclid Avenue during late weekday evenings and weekends to provide local service along the line.

21st century 

On January 23, 2005, a fire at the Chambers Street signal room crippled A and C service. Initial assessments suggested that it would take several years to restore normal service, but the damaged equipment was replaced with available spare parts, and normal service resumed on April 21.

A service was affected by Hurricane Sandy in October 2012, due to extreme damage to the IND Rockaway Line. Trains that normally traveled to Far Rockaway or Rockaway Park terminated at Howard Beach–JFK Airport. Service to the Rockaways resumed on May 30, 2013. The Far Rockaway part of the route was served by the temporary free H shuttle that ran between Far Rockaway and Beach 90th Street via the connecting track at Hammels Wye.

As a result of a two-phase program of flood mitigation work along the Hammels Wye, between April 9 and May 18, 2018, limited rush hour A service to/from Rockaway Park was suspended. The second phase, from July 1 to September 3, diverted all Far Rockaway-bound A trips to Rockaway Park, with Rockaway Park Shuttle trains being rerouted to the Far Rockaway branch through the southern leg of Hammels Wye.

From midday on March 29, 2020 to April 28, 2020, due to the suspension of C train service caused by the COVID-19 pandemic, A trains to Lefferts Boulevard ran local, while A trains to the Rockaways ran express.

Route

Service pattern 
The following table shows the lines used by the A, with shaded boxes indicating the route at the specified times:

Stations 
For a more detailed station listing, see the articles on the lines listed above.

For clarity, the A branches are shown separately in the following table. The leftmost column shows the Lefferts Boulevard service; the second column shows the Far Rockaway service; and the third column shows the Rockaway Park service.

In popular culture 
"Take the 'A' Train" is a jazz standard by Billy Strayhorn, referring to the A train, going at that time from eastern Brooklyn up into Harlem and northern Manhattan, using the express tracks in Manhattan. It became the signature tune of Duke Ellington and often opened the shows of Ella Fitzgerald. Part of the significance of this is sociological; it connected Harlem and Bedford–Stuyvesant, the two largest African American neighborhoods in New York City.

Notes

References

External links 

 MTA NYC Transit – A Eighth Avenue Express
 
 
 MTA NYC Transit – A C Line Review
 Main Document

New York City Subway services